

2018

Note

 
Seasons in Chilean football